Cryptoporus volvatus is a polypore fungus that decomposes the rotting sapwood of conifers. It is an after effect of attack by the pine bark beetle. The fungus was originally described by American mycologist Charles Horton Peck in 1875 as Polyporus volvatus. Cornelius Lott Shear transferred it to the genus Cryptoporus in 1902. The species is inedible.

The fruiting body is 2–6 across, and cream or tan in color. A hole is either torn by insects or a tear appears on the underside. The spores are pinkish.

References

Fungal tree pathogens and diseases
Fungi described in 1875
Fungi of North America
Inedible fungi
Polyporaceae
Taxa named by Charles Horton Peck